Gaylord is an unincorporated community in Coos County, Oregon, United States.

A station named Gaylord Siding was established on the Coos Bay Line of the Southern Pacific Railroad in 1916. A post office named Gaylord was established nearby in 1927; it closed in 1958. The source of the name is unknown.

Author Ralph Friedman says of Gaylord that it is "Nothing but a name".

References

Unincorporated communities in Coos County, Oregon
1927 establishments in Oregon
Unincorporated communities in Oregon